Svetlana Vladimirovna Petcherskaia;   (née Davidova), born 14 November 1968 in Sverdlovsk, is a former Soviet Union biathlete. The first time women's biathlon was contested at the Winter Olympics in Albertville in 1992, Petcherskia won a silver medal in the women's 15 km individual for the Unified Team.  In the 1990/91 season she won the overall world cup. In 1990 she became world champion in the 15 km.  During her career she won a total of 7 gold medals at World Championships, together with 3 silver medals and 1 bronze.

References

1968 births
Living people
Olympic silver medalists for the Unified Team
Biathletes at the 1992 Winter Olympics
Olympic biathletes of the Unified Team
Olympic medalists in biathlon
Soviet female biathletes
Biathlon World Championships medalists
Medalists at the 1992 Winter Olympics
Russian female biathletes